Moving On is a 1974 Australian film about a sheep farmer George Collier who moves to a county town. It was made by Film Australia to help draw attention to the problems the rural poor.

Cast
Ewen Solon as George Collier
Kay Taylor as Elizabeth Collier
Ken Shorter as Alan
Lyndell Rowe as Anne
Carole Yelland as Pauline
Brian Anderson as Ron
Michaelle Brooker as Margaret
Jonathan Hardy as Anne's boyfriend
jeff Ashby as city man
Bruce Spence as road worker
Roger Ward as sotcik agent
John Fegan as unemployed grower
Robert McDarra as financier
Carole Ashby

Release
The film was widely distributed through non-theatrical film libraries in Australia and screened on television in January 1974. The writer won an award with the Australian Writers Guild.

References

External links
Moving On at IMDb
Moving On at Oz Movies

Australian drama films
1970s English-language films
1974 films
1974 drama films
1970s Australian films